Bray-Dunes is a commune in the Nord department in northern France. It is situated on the Belgian border, with Adinkerke being the closest Belgian town. It is the northernmost commune and the northernmost point in all of France (mainland and overseas territories).

Bray-Dunes was the site of many casualties during World War II as a result of the Dunkirk evacuation.

Population

Heraldry

See also
Communes of the Nord department
Lamanère, the southernmost commune of Continental France

References

External links

 Official website (in French)
 Unofficial town website
 Website of the Association of the Friends of Bray-Dunes (in French)

Communes of Nord (French department)
French Flanders